Khioniya, Khionija, Khionia, and Chionia are transliterations of the Russian female name . It may refer to:
 Khioniya Guseva (c. 1880/81 – after 1919), who attempted to kill Grigori Rasputin in 1914. 
 Khioniya Talanova (1822–1880), Russian stage actress
 Chionia, reputed Christian martyred in AD 304 along with Agape and Irene 
 Khionia Alekseyevna Zaplatina, in the 1972 film Privalov's Millions, a character played by Lyudmila Shagalova
 Saint Khionia Archangelsky, commemorated in October 4 (Eastern Orthodox liturgics)

See also
 Khione (disambiguation)
 Fiona, sometimes used as an anglicised equivalent

Feminine given names
Russian feminine given names